Sydney PEN, also referred as International PEN Sydney Centre Inc., is based in Sydney, Australia.  Founded in 1931, it is one of the three Australian PEN Centres, and is an affiliate of PEN International. It is an association of Australian writers and readers, publishers and human rights activists, established with the aim to promote literature, freedom of expression and to foster local culture and understanding.

In November 2004, Sydney PEN, as part of the Australian PEN network, won the Human Rights and Equal Opportunity Community Award for its work with asylum seeker writers held in Australian detention centres.

History
Sydney PEN was founded in 1931 by Ethel Turner, Mary Gilmore, and Dorothea Mackellar. Since inception, it has conducted campaigns and events supporting literature, fostering international understanding and defending freedom of expression.

Sydney PEN Campaigns
In 2008, Sydney PEN, together with International Pen, helped to release 94 writers from prison.

Its Writers in Prison program selects urgent regional cases that feature public advocacy campaigns. It has carried out campaigns for Father Nguyen Van Ly, Tashi Rabten, Liu Xia, Gheyret Niyaz, Liu Xianbin, Tan Zuoren, Liu Xiaobo, Nurnuhemmet Yasin, Ragip Zarakolu and Busra Ersanh.

Awards & Recognitions

Sydney PEN Award
Established in 2006, Sydney PEN Award hosts annual awards that serve to recognise the members who has worked hard to promote the PEN Centre's value.

 Dr. Rosie Scott (2006)
 Nicholas Jose (2007)
 Chip Rolley (2008)
 Dr. Denise Leith (2009)
 Gaby Naher (2010)

PEN Keneally Award
Sydney PEN, along with other two Australian PEN Centres, established a new biennial award "PEN Keneally Award" in 2004, for recognising an achievement in promoting freedom of expression, international understanding and access to literature.

The award is named in the honour of Thomas Keneally AO for ‘his lifetime’s commitment to the values of PEN’.

Publications
Sydney PEN Magazine is a bi-annual publication, which contains articles, news on PEN's work, interviews, literary publications and translations. The magazine is produced in support by the Faculty of Arts and Social Sciences at the University of Technology, Sydney, and has been using CAL Cultural Fund.

See also

 International PEN
 PEN America
 PEN Canada

References

External links
Sydney PEN
Sydney PEN: Statement of Objects (Jan 2011)
Sydney PEN (Intl. PEN Sydney Centre) Incorporated
International PEN
Sydney PEN's Official Facebook Page

1931 establishments in Australia
International PEN centers
Organisations based in Sydney